Obburdon is a village and jamoat in north-western Tajikistan. It is located in Mastchoh District in Sughd Region. The jamoat has a total population of 37,104 (2015).

Notes

References

Populated places in Sughd Region
Jamoats of Tajikistan